Tourists are drawn to Switzerland's diverse landscape as well as the available activities, which take advantage of the Alpine climate and landscapes, in particular for skiing and mountaineering.

 tourism accounted for an estimated 2.6% (CHF 16.8 billion) of Switzerland's gross domestic product, compared to 2.6% (CHF 12.8 billion) in 2001.

History 

Tourism began in Switzerland with British mountaineers climbing the main peaks of the Bernese Alps in the early 19th century.

The Alpine Club in London was founded in 1857. Reconvalescence in the Alpine, in particular from tuberculosis, was another important branch of tourism in the 19th and early 20th centuries: for example in Davos, Graubünden. Due to the prominence of the Bernese Alps in British mountaineering, the Bernese Oberland was long especially known as a tourist destination. Meiringen's  Reichenbach Falls achieved literary fame as the site of the fictional death of Sir Arthur Conan Doyle's Sherlock Holmes (1893). The first organised tourist holidays to Switzerland were offered during the 19th century by Thomas Cook and Lunn Travel companies. Tourism in Switzerland had been exclusively for the rich until it became widely popular in the 20th century. ' Notable tourist destinations in Switzerland 

Large cities
Zürich
Bern
Lucerne
Basel
Geneva
Lausanne

Smaller cities
Montreux
Sion
Thun
Neuchâtel
Fribourg
Schaffhausen
St. Gallen
Chur
Lugano

 Resorts in the Alps

 Grisons
 St. Moritz
 Scuol
 Davos
 Arosa
Central Switzerland
Engelberg
Andermatt
 Eastern Switzerland
 Appenzell
 Wildhaus
 Valais
 Aletsch
 Verbier
 Crans-Montana
 Saas-Fee
 Zermatt
Vaud
Leysin
 Bernese Oberland
 Grindelwald
 Gstaad
 Interlaken
 Ticino
 Airolo

 Natural regions
Bernese Alps, between the Swiss Plateau and Valais, known for its high mountains (notably Eiger, Mönch and Jungfrau) and huge glaciers (notably the Aletsch Glacier), and deep valleys with waterfalls like the Lauterbrunnental
Valais Alps, on the left side of the Rhone valley, contains the highest mountains in the country (notably Monte Rosa and the Matterhorn) and big ski resorts like Zermatt
Gotthard Massif, with the Gotthard Pass at its heart, notable for the historic Gotthard routes (north-south axis), the Matterhorn Gotthard Bahn railway (west-east axis) and the many other high road passes (Nufenen, Grimsel, Furka, Susten, Klausen, Oberalp and Lukmanier)
Lake Lucerne, the largest lake in central Switzerland, notable for the many mountain railways in the surrounding mountains, notably the Rigi and Pilatus Railway
Lake Geneva, the largest lake in the country, notable for the Riviera and the many vineyards
Lake Constance, the second largest lake in the country
Seeland, the region of Lake Neuchâtel, Lake Biel and Lake Morat
Jura Mountains, a moderately elevated mountain region north of the Swiss Plateau
Rhine, the largest river in the country, is also notable for the Rhine Falls
Italian Lakes, a group of lakes on the Italian border (Maggiore and Lugano), notable for being the warmest place in the country

Activities

Hiking
Hiking is one of the main sports activities in Switzerland and is often referred to as the "national sport". About one-third of the population practises hiking regularly, with a total of 520 million kilometres (in 130 million hours) being travelled every year by the Swiss. Along with cycling, walking, in general, is the preferred form of mobility, regardless of social origins. The total hiking trail network is about 65,000 kilometres.

Tourist attractions

 Statistics 
Official statistics of tourism were planned in 1852, but were only realized in 1934, and continued until 2003. Since 2004, the Federal Statistical Office had discontinued its statistics, but collaborates with Switzerland Tourism in the publication of yearly "Swiss Tourism Figures". In the year 2011, a total number of 4,967 registered hotels or hostels, offered a total of 240,000 beds in 128,000 rooms. This capacity was saturated to 41.7% (compared to 39.7% in 2005), amounting to a total of 38.8 million lodging nights. 
14% of hotels were in Grisons, 12% each in the Valais and Eastern Switzerland, 11% in Central Switzerland and 9% in the Bernese Oberland. The ratio of lodging nights in relation to resident population ("tourism intensity", a measure for the relative importance of tourism to local economy) was largest in Grisons (8.3) and Bernese Oberland (5.3), compared to a Swiss average of 1.3. 56.4% of lodging nights were by visitors from abroad (broken down by nationality: 16.5% Germany, 6.3% United Kingdom, 4.8% United States, 3.6% France, 3.0% Italy).

The total financial volume associated with tourism, including transportation, is estimated to CHF 35.5 billion (as of 2010) although some of this comes from fuel tax and sales of motorway vignettes. The total gross value added from tourism is 14.9 billion. Tourism provides a total of 144,838 full-time equivalent jobs in the entire country. The total financial volume of tourist lodging is 5.19 billion CHF and eating at the lodging provides an additional 5.19 billion. The total gross value added of 14.9 billion is about 2.9% of Switzerland's 2010 nominal GDP of 550.57 billion CHF.SECO Gross domestic product - quarterly estimates  (page visited on 7 May 2012).

The most visited Swiss tourist attractions are first, the Rhine Falls, second, the Berne Bear exhibit (both without entrance fee), and third, with over 1.8 million paid entries: Zoo Basel.

Overnight stays by country
Most overnight stays in 2019 in Switzerland were from the following countries of residence:

 See also 
 List of World Heritage Sites in Switzerland
 List of ski areas and resorts in Switzerland
 Economy of Switzerland
 Geography of Switzerland
Swiss School of Tourism and Hospitality

 Notes and references 

 Bibliography 

 Barton, Susan. Healthy living in the Alps: The origins of winter tourism in Switzerland, 1860-1914 (Manchester University Press, 2008). 
 Dominici, Sara, and Robert Maitland. "The PTA: Promoting Swiss Tours, 1888–1939." Annals of Tourism Research 60 (2016): 31-47.
 Orland, Barbara. "Alpine Landscapes of Health: The Swiss Whey Cure and Therapeutic Tourism between 1750 and 1870." in Connecting Territories (Brill, 2021) pp. 210-241.
 Tonnerre, Quentin. "The 1928 Olympic Winter Games in St Moritz: Tourism, Diplomacy and Domestic Politics." International Journal of the History of Sport 38.13-14 (2021): 1385-1402. online
 Vonnard, Philippe, and Grégory Quin. "More than just football. Reflections on the case of the 1954 World Cup in Switzerland." Entreprises et histoire 4 (2018): 75-89. One goal was more tourists. online

  Christophe Clivaz, Tourisme d'hiver, le défi climatique'' [literally, "Winter tourism, the climate challenge"], Presses polytechniques et universitaires romandes, collection "Le Savoir suisse", 144 pages, 2015.

External links 

 Switzerland Tourism, a national tourism organisation
 

 
Economy of Switzerland
Switzerland